Krishna Murari (born: 9 July 1958) is a judge of Supreme Court of India and former chief justice of Punjab and Haryana High Court. He has also served as a judge of Allahabad High Court till his elevation as chief justice of Punjab and Haryana High Court.

Career
Murari was born in a lawyer family of Uttar Pradesh. His uncle G.N. Verma & R.N. Verma were  senior advocate and a leading lawyer. Murari passed Bachelor of Laws from the Allahabad University, Prayagraj. He was enrolled as an advocate on 23 December 1981 and started practice in the Allahabad High Court on civil, constitutional, company and revenue matters. In his 22 years law career, he served as standing counsel of Uttar Pradesh State Yarn Company, Northern Railway Primary Co-operative Bank, Uttar Pradesh State Textile Corporation etc. He also appeared for Bundelkhand University of Jhansi. Murari was appointed an additional judge of the Allahabad High Court on 7 January 2004 and became the permanent judge in 2005. On 2 June 2018 he was elevated in the post of the chief justice of Punjab and Haryana High Court in Chandigarh after the retirement of Justice Shiavax Jal Vazifdar. He was elevated as judge of Supreme Court of India on 23 September 2019.

References

1958 births
Living people
21st-century Indian judges
21st-century Indian lawyers
Chief Justices of the Punjab and Haryana High Court
Judges of the Allahabad High Court
Justices of the Supreme Court of India
University of Allahabad alumni